Elections to Stevenage Council were held on 6 May 2010. One third of the council stood for election; the seats which were last contested in 2006. The election saw the Conservative Party gain a further 3 seats.

After the election, the composition of the council was:
Labour 27
Conservative 9
Liberal Democrat 3

Election result

Ward results

Bandley Hill

Bedwell

Chells

Longmeadow

Manor

Martins Wood

Old Town

Pin Green

Roebuck

St Nicholas

Shephall

Symonds Green

Woodfield

Note: Woodfield ward was won by Marion Mason for the Conservatives in 2006, but she defected to UKIP in January 2008.

References

2010
2010 English local elections
May 2010 events in the United Kingdom
2010s in Hertfordshire